Altro is an unincorporated community and coal town in Breathitt County, Kentucky, United States. Their post office closed in 1994. Altro is on the North Fork of the Kentucky River.

References

Unincorporated communities in Breathitt County, Kentucky
Unincorporated communities in Kentucky
Coal towns in Kentucky